The Infernal Depths of Hatred is Anata's first full length album, originally released on Season of Mist Records on CD in 1998 then reissued on vinyl through KaosKvlt (Kaotoxin) in 2016.

Track listing
"Released When You Are Dead" – 4:22
"Let the Heavens Hate" – 3:49
"Under Azure Skies" – 5:39
"Vast Lands / Infernal Gates" - 5:07
"Slain Upon His Altar" - 4:39
"Those Who Lick the Wounds of Christ" - 6:48
"Dethrone the Hypocrites" - 6:04
"Aim Not at the Kingdom High" - 5:46
"Day of Suffering" - 1:37 (vinyl bonus track, Morbid Angel cover)

Personnel
 Fredrik Schälin - vocals, guitar
 Andreas Allenmark - guitar
 Henrik Drake - bass
 Robert Petersson - drums

1998 albums
Anata (band) albums
Season of Mist albums